Banks Township is the name of some places in the U.S. state of Pennsylvania:

Banks Township, Carbon County, Pennsylvania
Banks Township, Indiana County, Pennsylvania

Pennsylvania township disambiguation pages